Dowshdur (also known as Dowshtūr) is a village in Vargahan Rural District of the Central District of Ahar County, East Azerbaijan province, Iran. At the 2006 census, its population was 965 in 204 households. The following census in 2011 counted 935 people in 253 households. The latest census in 2016 showed a population of 969 people in 282 households; it was the largest village in its rural district.

References 

Ahar County

Populated places in East Azerbaijan Province

Populated places in Ahar County